Joseph Bancroft (21 February 1836 – 16 June 1894) was a surgeon, pharmacologist and parasitologist born in England, who emigrated to Queensland, Australia.

Early life
Bancroft was born in Stretford, near Manchester, Lancashire, the only son of Joseph Bancroft, a farmer, and his wife Mary, née Lane.  He took a five-year apprenticeship with Dr Jeremiah Renshaw at Sale in Cheshire.  He later studied at the Manchester Royal School of Medicine and Surgery (M.R.C.S., L.S.A., 1859), where he won several prizes.  He took his medical degree at the University of St Andrews in 1859 and later became a member of the Royal College of Surgeons.  He practised at Nottingham until 1864, then emigrated to Queensland after being advised a warmer climate would improve his health.

Career in Australia
Bancroft arrived in Brisbane on 29 October 1864, having travelled on the Lady Young as a surgeon. After a short holiday he began to practise in a residential quarter of Brisbane, and soon became a respected physician and surgeon. He was an early tenant of the (now heritage-listed) Athol Place on Wickham Terrace in Spring Hill.

In 1867 he was appointed visiting surgeon at the Brisbane General Hospital and became house surgeon in 1868. He resumed practice at Carlton in Wickham Terrace in 1870, found himself in much demand, but contrived to do a good deal of research. He was the discoverer of the medical properties of Duboisia myoporoides, which was afterwards largely used in ophthalmic surgery. In 1872 he investigated the properties of Duboisia hopwoodii a common ingredient in the eastern Australian variety of the native chewing mixture, pituri. In 1877 he travelled to the East, Europe and Africa, supposedly on holiday, however he could not refrain from studying diseases peculiar to each country.

After Bancroft's return from his travels, he carried on a large practice and, in addition to his scientific research on medical problems, developed his interest in economic botany. He made many experiments to obtain a rust-proof wheat, showed great interest in viticulture and the culture of oysters, studied the diseases of the banana and sugar cane, and invented a preparation of pemmican or desiccated beef. The medical properties of numerous native plants were investigated; he prepared a pamphlet, Contribution to Pharmacy from Queensland, for the 1886 colonial and Indian exhibition held in London. In 1888 Bancroft reluctantly joined the Royal Commission to investigate the rabbit problem. Shortly before his death he was on the sub-committee appointed by the Medical Society of Queensland to assist in the revision of the British Pharmacopoeia. He made important researches in leprosy and became well known through his studies in filaria disease; he was the discoverer of the mature parasite Filaria bancrofti and was one of the first to suggest it was borne by mosquitoes. Bancroft was a leading scientist of his period in Queensland. He was at various times vice-president of the Australasian Association for the Advancement of Science, president of the Queensland Medical Board, of the Royal Society of Queensland and the Medical Society of Queensland.

Later life 

Bancroft died suddenly in Ann Street, Brisbane on 16 June 1894, he was survived by his wife, a daughter and a son, Dr. Thomas Lane Bancroft (1860–1933), who also did valuable scientific work.

Legacy 
The main building of the Queensland Institute of Medical Research is named the Bancroft Centre in honour of Bancroft's role as the key figure in establishing medical research in Queensland.

The electoral district of Bancroft created in the 2017 Queensland state electoral redistribution was named after him.

There is a monument to Joseph Bancroft and his son Thomas Lane Bancroft in Bancroft Park, Captain Cook Parade, Deception Bay. It was unveiled on Sunday 21 July 1963 by the Queensland branch of the Australian Medical Association, the Caboolture Shire Council, and the Caboolture Historical Society.

Several streets have been named after Bancroft including Bancroft Terrace and Joseph Crescent in Deception Bay, and Bancroft Street in Kelvin Grove.

The papers of Dr Joseph Bancroft and his son are held by the State Library of Queensland.

References

 
 Queensland Institute of Medical Research History
M. Josephine Mackerras, 'Bancroft, Joseph (1836–1894)', Australian Dictionary of Biography, Volume 3, MUP, 1969, pp 84–85.

Further reading
 
Additional source listed by the Australian Dictionary of Biography:
E. Ford, 'The life and influence of Joseph Bancroft', Medical Journal of Australia, 4 February 1961

External links 
Dr Joseph Bancroft and Dr Thomas Lane Bancroft Papers. State Library of Queensland 

.

People in health professions from Manchester
1836 births
1894 deaths
People from Stretford
English emigrants to Australia
Alumni of the University of St Andrews
English surgeons
Royal Society of Queensland